|}

The Robert Mottram Memorial Trophy, currently sponsored by Dunraven Windows, is a Listed National Hunt chase in Great Britain which is open to horses aged four years or older. The race  is for novice chasers, is run at Chepstow over a distance of about 2 miles and 3½ furlongs (2 miles 3 furlongs and 98 yards, or 3,914 metres), and is scheduled to take place each year in October.

The race was first run in 2011 and was awarded Listed status in 2017.

Winners

See also
 Horse racing in Great Britain
 List of British National Hunt races

References
 
Racing Post: 

National Hunt races in Great Britain
Chepstow Racecourse
National Hunt chases
Recurring sporting events established in 2011
2011 establishments in Wales